Hemyock is a village and civil parish in Devon, England. The 2011 Census recorded the parish's population as 1,519. Hemyock is part of the electoral ward of Upper Culm. The population of this ward at the above census was 4,039. The River Culm flows through Hemyock. Hemyock was the former home of the St Ivel dairy processing plant, formerly where the butter-spreads 'St Ivel Gold' and 'Utterly-Butterly' were produced before being moved to a factory in the north of England.

Hemyock was also the birthplace of the National Federation of Young Farmers' Clubs. The first Young Culm Farmers Club in England began here in 1921, and it continues to prosper as the Culm Valley Young Farmers Club.

Hemyock is the largest village on the Blackdown Hills, which is now designated as an Area of Outstanding Natural Beauty (AONB). The parish has an area of about 2350 hectares, and lies on the NW of the Blackdown Hills. Its northern boundary forms part of the Devon – Somerset border, and clockwise from there, it is surrounded by the Devon parishes of Clayhidon, Dunkeswell, Uffculme and Culmstock.

Population
Hemyock is a typical upland settlement consisting of a central "town" surrounded by a number of hamlets (Culm Davey, Millhayes, Simonsburrow, Ashculme, Tedburrow, Madford, Mountshayne etc.). From the 16th century to the early 19th century much of the parish's wealth came from the production of wool. The population remained fairly constant throughout the 19th century, and until the end of the Second World War. Since then a number of housing estates have been built, and the population has increased to 1,519.

History
The village has a very long history and some prehistoric remains may be found, from about 100 BC to well beyond. In the Middle Ages local iron ores were smelted in small bloomeries (furnaces) to produce pure iron. In Saxon times a battle was fought at Simonsburrow between the native Britons and King Ime's[Ine?] Saxon army, which put an end (temporarily) to the King's expansion to the west.

The name Hemyock could have originated from the British stream name "Samiaco" (meaning summer), other authorities suggest a Saxon origin from a personal name "Hemman" coupled with a Saxon word for a bend or a hook (occi).

Hemyock Hundred
Hemyock was head of the Hemyock Hundred, an administrative sub-division of the Shire county of Devonshire, under the system of government used during the Saxon period. The Domesday Book records that the Hemyock Hundred consisted of the manors of: Awliscombe, Bolham Water, Bywood, Churchstanton (Somerset), Clayhidon, Culm Davy, Culm Pyne, Culmstock, Dunkeswell, Gorewell, Hemyock, Hole, Ivedon, Mackham, Weston.

Hemyock Castle

On 5 November 1380, King Richard II granted Sir William and Lady Margaret Asthorpe a licence to crenellate the Hemyock manor house; meaning the permission to fortify it. Hemyock Castle has many similarities with the much better known Bodiam Castle, granted the licence to crenellate in 1385. Over the centuries, Hemyock Castle had many notable owners including Lord Chief Justice Sir John Popham and General Sir John Graves Simcoe the first lieutenant-governor of Upper Canada in 1792. He is buried at Wolford Chapel near Dunkeswell. The chapel is now owned by the Province of Ontario.

During the English Civil War it was held for Parliament, subjected to a brief but brutal siege and eventually slighted to destroy its military value. Parts of the castle walls, towers and moat still remain. They are a scheduled ancient monument. The castle site is privately owned: Visits can be arranged for groups; there are also public open days.

Churches
St Mary's parish church is next to Hemyock Castle, on the other side of St Margaret's Brook. The Baptist Church is at the top of Station Road.

Notable people
The Cadbury family, founders of the Cadbury chocolate company, is said to have originated here.

The Cat of Lower Greenfield [Moof Flowers, Resident of Lord Webb Manor]

Facilities
Hemyock remains a viable village, with a school, medical facilities, one garage, one accident repair centre, two hairdressers, one public house, one convenience store, one Post Office & store, two playing fields, a Parish Hall, a community centre and two churches.

Transport
Local bus services 20, 20A, 397, 675 are operated by Stagecoach.

Industry
The first mechanically operated butter factory in the West of England was started at Mountshayne in 1886 by 4 local farmers, this was later transferred to Millhayes, subsequently becoming part of St. Ivel. It was closed in the 1990s. The site has been re-developed for housing.

References

External links

 Hemyock village website
 Hemyock Castle
 Hemyock village trail and map
 Blackdown Hills Archives

Civil parishes in Devon
Villages in Devon